Hartmann mask is a tool to help focusing telescopes, mainly used by amateur astronomers. It is named after the German astronomer Johannes Franz Hartmann (1865–1936), who developed it around 1900.

Theory and practice 
Every part of a mirror or lens produces the same image as the whole optical element. The light is focused in the focal point. The light rays, however, go through different points of a plane before or behind the focus.

This phenomenon can be used when focusing a telescope. The Hartmann mask is a simple opaque mask containing two or three holes. (This device is called a Hartmann mask if it has multiple holes, or a Scheiner disk if it has two holes.) The mask covers the aperture of the telescope. 

When the apparatus is out of focus, multiple images can be seen if the telescope is pointed towards a bright light source (Moon, bright star). Adjusting the focuser, the images can be made to overlap, forming a single bright, clear picture. The mask may also be used to check the figure of a mirror, as the holes in the mask should all produce the same image.

See also
 Bahtinov mask
 Carey mask
 Shack–Hartmann wavefront sensor

Notes

References
 How-to Make a Hartmann Mask
 Hartman Mask Project

Optical devices
Telescopes